The 1972–73 West Midlands (Regional) League season was the 73rd in the history of the West Midlands (Regional) League, an English association football competition for semi-professional and amateur teams based in the West Midlands county, Shropshire, Herefordshire, Worcestershire and southern Staffordshire.

Premier Division

The Premier Division featured 12 clubs which competed in the division last season, along with four new clubs:
Brereton Social, promoted from Division One
Heanor Town, transferred from the Midland League
Hereford United reserves
Warley County Borough, promoted from Division One

Also, Lower Gornal Athletic changed name to Gornal Athletic.

League table

References

External links

1972–73
W